Kamışlı can refer to:

 Kamışlı, Bismil
 Kamışlı, Karataş
 Kamışlı, Kozluk
 Kamışlı, Kulp
 Kamışlı, Merzifon
 Kamışlı, Pozantı
 Kamışlı, Sungurlu
 Qamishli, Syria